Strategic Command WWII Global Conflict is a grand strategy computer game developed by Fury Software, and published by Battlefront.com. The game was released on 4 March 2010. It is the fourth title in the Strategic Command series. As the previous installments, it is a turn-based strategy set in World War II. For the first time, the main campaigns don't focus on a particular theater of war. Instead, the game features a map of the whole world. The player controls all of either Axis or Allied states.

Notes and references

External links
 Strategic Command WWII Global Conflict official website

2010 video games
Windows games
Windows-only games
Computer wargames
World War II grand strategy computer games
Battlefront.com games
Turn-based strategy video games
Grand strategy video games
Video games developed in Canada